Andros is an island of the Cyclades, Greece.

Andros may also refer to:

Places 
 Andros (city), an ancient city on the Greek Island
 Andros (town), the capital of the Greek island 
 Andros, Bahamas, an island in the Atlantic Ocean
 Andros Town, a town on that island in the Bahamas

Other uses 
 Andros (company), French food company
 Andros (name), a given name and surname (including a list of people with the name)
 ANDROS, a military and police robot
 Andros Maritime Museum, a museum in Andros, Greece
 Andros Trophy, the French national ice racing championship
 Andrée & Rosenqvist, a boat building yard and engineering works in Finland

See also 
 Battle of Andros (disambiguation)